Ileibacterium massiliense  is a bacterium from the genus of Ileibacterium which has been isolated from the ileum of a human.

References 

Erysipelotrichia
Bacteria described in 2017